Ayiesha Naazmi Johnston (born 28 November 1988) is an Australian rhythmic gymnast who represented Australia at the 2008 Summer Olympics as well as the 2006 Commonwealth Games. She competed at world championships, including at the 2005 World Rhythmic Gymnastics Championships, 2009 World Rhythmic Gymnastics Championships and 2010 World Rhythmic Gymnastics Championships.

Career
Johnston was born on 28 November 1988 to an Australian father and Maldivian mother. She has one brother and three sisters. Johnston being the second youngest in the family.
Johnston was a participate on the show Australia's Got Talent with a group called Meriden Rhythmix, they performed routines of rhythmic gymnastics and made it to the semi-finals before being eliminated.
Johnston has been ranked as Australia's best gymnast on several occasions. She was coached by Danielle Le Ray.
She currently has two Boxer puppies, Lewis and Georgia.

School life

Naazmi Johnston studied at Concord Primary school. She attended high school at Newtown High School of the Performing Arts and Moreton Bay College.

References

External links
 
 
 
 
 

1988 births
Living people
Australian rhythmic gymnasts
Gymnasts at the 2008 Summer Olympics
Olympic gymnasts of Australia
Gymnasts at the 2006 Commonwealth Games
Commonwealth Games gold medallists for Australia
Gymnasts at the 2010 Commonwealth Games
Commonwealth Games silver medallists for Australia
Commonwealth Games bronze medallists for Australia
Commonwealth Games medallists in gymnastics
21st-century Australian women
Sportspeople from Sydney
Sportswomen from New South Wales
Australian people of Maldivian descent
Medallists at the 2006 Commonwealth Games
Medallists at the 2010 Commonwealth Games